Rock Creek Township is one of twenty-five townships in Hancock County, Illinois, United States.  As of the 2010 census, its population was 350 and it contained 169 housing units.  It was formed from Sonora and Pilot Grove townships on April 27, 1855.

Geography

Cities, towns, villages
 Ferris (vast majority)

Unincorporated towns
 Adrian at 
(This list is based on USGS data and may include former settlements.)

Cemeteries
The township contains Rock Creek Cemetery.

Many of the old gravestones are no longer legible. A large stone designating Rock Creek Cemetery has the names of descendants on its back.

Demographics

School districts
 Hamilton Community Consolidated School District 328
 Nauvoo-Colusa Community Unit School District 325

Political districts
 Illinois's 17th congressional district
 State House District 94
 State Senate District 47

References
 United States Census Bureau 2008 TIGER/Line Shapefiles
 
 United States National Atlas

External links
 City-Data.com
 Illinois State Archives
 Township Officials of Illinois

Townships in Hancock County, Illinois
1855 establishments in Illinois
Populated places established in 1855
Townships in Illinois